Alejo Saravia Pacheco (born January 29, 1985) is a Uruguayan footballer who plays for Rocha in the Uruguayan Segunda División, as a second striker.

Teams
  Miramar Misiones 2007–08
  Cerro Largo 2009
  Bella Vista 2009–10
  Rocha 2010–11
  Progreso (A) 2011
  Mushuc Runa 2012
  Rocha 2013–present

External links
 Profile at Ecuagol Profile at
 
 Profile at Footballdatabase Profile at

1985 births
Living people
Uruguayan people of Portuguese descent
Uruguayan footballers
Uruguayan expatriate footballers
Miramar Misiones players
Cerro Largo F.C. players
C.A. Bella Vista players
Rocha F.C. players
Expatriate footballers in Ecuador

Association football forwards